Aufwuchs Lake is a lake in Stillwater County, Montana, in the United States.

The name Aufwuchs Lake, derived from the German loan word Aufwuchs, refers to the lake's ecology.

See also
List of lakes in Montana

References

Lakes of Montana
Bodies of water of Stillwater County, Montana